Bruno Hartmann (born 4 October 1946) is an Austrian former wrestler who competed in the 1972 Summer Olympics.

References

External links
 

1946 births
Living people
Olympic wrestlers of Austria
Wrestlers at the 1972 Summer Olympics
Austrian male sport wrestlers